Dennick Luke (born 28 January 2001) is a Dominican middle-distance runner. In 2022 he became the national record holder over 800 metres.

Career
Dennick was selected to compete at the 2020 Summer Olympics in the 800 metres. He was also given the honour of being the flag bearer for his nation in the opening ceremony. In the race itself, Luke finished eighth in his qualifying heat after falling to the ground after being clipped by another athlete. He finished in a time of 1.54:30.

His personal best on 800 m, is also the national record. He ran 1:48.22 at the National Stadium, Kingston, Jamaica on 11 June 2022  breaking the 11 year-old record of Erison Hurtault who ran 1:48.60 in 2011. Luke competed at the 2022 Commonwealth Games in Birmingham, England, finishing sixth in his 800m heat in a time of 1:50.06.

References

External links
 

2001 births
Living people
Athletes (track and field) at the 2020 Summer Olympics
Olympic athletes of Dominica
Dominica male middle-distance runners
People from Saint John Parish, Dominica